Burtland "Burt" Cummings (born November 19, 1965) is a former American football defensive back who played four seasons in the Canadian Football League (CFL) with the Winnipeg Blue Bombers, Ottawa Rough Riders and BC Lions. He was drafted by the Hamilton Tiger-Cats in the fourth round of the 1988 CFL Draft. He played college football at the University of North Dakota.

References

External links
Just Sports Stats

Living people
1965 births
American football defensive backs
Canadian football defensive backs
American players of Canadian football
North Dakota Fighting Hawks football players
Winnipeg Blue Bombers players
Ottawa Rough Riders players
BC Lions players
Sportspeople from London